Jidong County is a county of southeastern Heilongjiang Province, China, bordering Russia's Primorsky Krai to the southeast. It is under the administration of Jixi City and is the location of Jixi Xingkaihu Airport.

Administrative divisions 
Jidong County is divided into 8 towns and 3 townships. 
8 towns
 Jidong, Pingyang, Xiangyang, Hada, Yong'an, Yonghe, Donghai, Xingnong
3 townships
 Jilin, Mingde, Xialiangzi

Climate

References

 
County level divisions of Heilongjiang
Jixi